Main Street Historic District is a national historic district located at Whitehall in Washington County, New York.  It includes 40 contributing buildings.  It encompasses a three-block-long row of two- and three- story brick and stone commercial structures facing the Champlain Canal.  The structures were built between 1865 and 1900, after the fire of 1864.  Most were designed by local architect Almon Chandler Hopson, who also designed the Judge Joseph Potter House.

It was listed on the National Register of Historic Places in 1975.

Gallery

References

Historic districts on the National Register of Historic Places in New York (state)
Historic districts in Washington County, New York
National Register of Historic Places in Washington County, New York